Music from Other Galaxies and Planets is an album by trumpeter/bandleader Don Ellis recorded in 1977 and released on the Atlantic label. The album features Ellis' recording of the "Theme from Star Wars" which was released as a single.

Reception

The album was not particularly well received, despite the massive popularity of Star Wars and the iconic John Williams score it produced. Scott Yanow of Allmusic said "This LP is the only complete misfire of Don Ellis' career. ...Ellis' big band has little to do other than play mundane ensembles and take occasional short solos. This is the one Don Ellis record that should be skipped".

Track listing 
All compositions by Don Ellis except as indicated
 "Star Wars" (John Williams) - 3:23		
 "Arcturas" - 5:44	
 "Princess Leia's Theme" (Williams) - 3:49		
 "Orion's Sword" - 3:47		
 "Pegasus" - 2:44		
 "Crypton" - 3:31		
 "Lyra" - 5:51		
 "Eros" - 4:12		
 "Ursa" - 2:48		
 "Vulcan" - 4:37

Personnel 
Don Ellis - trumpet, firebird trumpet, flugelhorn, superbone, arranger
Ann Patterson – alto saxophone,  soprano saxophone, oboe, piccolo, alto flute
Ted Nash - alto saxophone, flute, clarinet
James Coile - tenor saxophone, clarinet, flute
Jim Snodgrass - baritone saxophone, bass clarinet, piccolo, flute, oboe
Glenn Stuart, Gil Rathel, Jack Coan – trumpet
Sidney Muldrew – French Horn
Alan Kaplan – trombone
Richard Bullock – bass trombone
Jim Self – tuba
Randy Kerber – synthesizer, piano, electric piano, clavinet
Darrel Clayborn - double bass
Dave Crigger, Mike Englander - drums
Chino Valdes, Ruth Richie - percussion
Pam Tompkins, Laurie Badessa - violin
Jimbo Ross - viola
Paula Hochhalter - cello

References 

Don Ellis albums
1977 albums
Atlantic Records albums